Novi Pot is a small remote settlement in the hills northwest of Sodražica in southern Slovenia. The area is part of the traditional region of Lower Carniola and is now included in the Southeast Slovenia Statistical Region.

References

External links
Novi Pot on Geopedia

Populated places in the Municipality of Sodražica